The East Pyramids comprise a group of three steep, rocky unpopulated islets located close to the south-western coast of Tasmania, Australia. The East Pyramids are part of the Southwest National Park and the Tasmanian Wilderness World Heritage Site.

Flora and fauna
The islets are part of the Port Davey Islands Important Bird Area, so identified by BirdLife International because of its importance for breeding seabirds. What vegetation there is on these rocks is dominated by Poa, pig face and ferns.  Recorded breeding seabird species are the fairy prion (100 pairs), Pacific gull, silver gull and black-faced cormorant.

See also

 List of islands of Tasmania

References

Islands of South West Tasmania
Protected areas of Tasmania
Important Bird Areas of Tasmania